Dark Spaces is the sixth studio album by Australian rock music singer-songwriter, Richard Clapton. It was recorded in USA, produced by Dallas Smith and released in Australia in August 1980. It peaked at No. 23 on the Kent Music Report Albums Chart.

The album featured the line-up of Tony Ansell, Mark Moffatt (lead guitar), Stars' Andrew Durant (rhythm guitar), Clive Harrison (bass; ex-Kush, Avalanche) and Dragon's Kerry Jacobsen (drums), plus contributions from Cleis Pearce (viola), Tony Buchanan (sax), Sam McNally (synthesiser; ex-Stylus) and Mark Meyer (drums). Clapton dedicated the album to Durant, who died in June 1980.

Track listing

Charts

Release history

References 

1980 albums
Richard Clapton albums
Festival Records albums
Infinity Records albums